National Tertiary Route 737, or just Route 737 (or ) is a National Road Route of Costa Rica, located in the Alajuela province.

Description
In Alajuela province the route covers Upala canton (Aguas Claras district).

References

Highways in Costa Rica